This is a list of Jewish winners and nominees of Academy Awards. It includes ethnic Jews and those who converted to Judaism.

Best Actor in a Leading Role

Best Actress in a Leading Role

Best Actor in a Supporting Role

Best Actress in a Supporting Role

Best Animated Feature

Best Assistant Director

Note: Defunct category.

Best Cinematography

Best Costume Design

Best Dance Direction

Note: Defunct category.

Best Director

Best Documentary Feature

Best Documentary (Short Subject)

Best Film Editing

Best International Feature Film
The Academy Award for Best International Feature Film is awarded to countries, not individuals. This list contains Jewish directors of nominated films, who typically accept the award on behalf of their country.

Best Makeup and Hairstyling

Best Music, Original Score

Best Music, Original Song

Best Picture

Best Production Design

Best Animated Short Film

Best Live Action Short Film

Best Sound

Best Story

Note: Defunct category.

Best Visual Effects

Best Writing (Adapted Screenplay)

Best Writing (Original Screenplay)

Special awards

References

General
 

Specific

Jewish
Jewish
Academy Awards
Academy Awards

Academy Award winners and nominees